Douchy is a former commune in the Loiret department in north-central France. On 1 January 2016, it was merged into the new commune of Douchy-Montcorbon.

Geography
The commune is traversed by the river Ouanne.

Notable people
 Alain Delon, French actor and businessman, lives in Douchy a large part of the year, since 1971. 
 Mireille Darc, French model and actress, lived also in Douchy when she was Alain Delon's longtime companion.

See also
Communes of the Loiret department

References

Former communes of Loiret